Bilal Najjarin is an Australian former rugby league footballer who represented Lebanon at the 2000 Rugby League World Cup.

Background
Najjarin was born in Australia.

Playing career
He also played in a test match against France in 2002.

References

Living people
Australian rugby league players
Lebanon national rugby league team players
Rugby league wingers
Australian people of Lebanese descent
Rugby league fullbacks
Year of birth missing (living people)